Golden Valley High School is a high school located within the Merced Union High School District in the community of Merced, California, United States. The school first opened in August 1994, with its first class of seniors graduating on June 5, 1996.  The current enrollment is over 1,700 students in grades 9 through 12.

Academics

Enrollment
According to the United States Department of Education's National Center for Education Statistics, enrollment characteristics for the 2014-2015 school year were as follows:

Rankings
Golden Valley's Advanced Placement program has earned the praise of Newsweek magazine, which  named it a "Top 1300" school in the United States, three years running. Golden Valley has also garnered a Silver Award from U.S. News & World Report, which named it one of the top 1,800 schools in the United States.

Rivals

The cross-town Bears of Merced High School have been the Cougars' rivals since Golden Valley opened in 1994.

Merced has a deep and long-standing animosity with the Atwater High School Falcons, both in sports and in academics. As the city of Merced grew, so did its student population, forcing the freshmen to be bussed to a different area of the city known as "East Campus" in order to adequately fit them all. This eventually drove the city to develop plans for a second city high school, Golden Valley High. Until the new school's opening, the main rival for the Merced Bears was the Atwater Falcons.

However, the opening of Golden Valley prompted a split in districting of Merced, and nearly half of the first-year students at the new campus were from Merced High. Since then a great competition between "old school" and "new school"  has sprung up, and Atwater has fallen into a close second-rival for both city schools.

See also
Buhach Colony High School
Livingston High School
Los Banos High School
Merced High School

References

External links
Golden Valley High School website
Merced Union High School District website

High schools in Merced County, California
Public high schools in California
Golden Valley High School
1994 establishments in California